Latvia was represented by 21 athletes at the 2010 European Athletics Championships in Barcelona, Spain, including also the defending European champion in 110 metres hurdles Staņislavs Olijars. 

Due to lack of funds, the Latvian Athletics Union was unable to fund Latvian delegation's participation in the event. Initially, also Dmitrijs Miļkevičs and Edgars Eriņš were among the competitors, but they decided not to participate, once they acknowledged the situation.

Results
At the 2010 European Athletics Championships Latvia won a total of 2 medals: 1 bronze and 1 gold.

Medal table

Medalists

Men
Track and road events

Field events

Women
Track and road events

Field events

Nations at the 2010 European Athletics Championships
2010
European Athletics Championships